Founded in 1905, the 2019–20 season was Charlton Athletic's 114th season in their existence. Along with competing in the Championship, the club also participated in the FA Cup and EFL Cup. The season covered the period from 1 July 2019 to 31 July 2020.

Due to the COVID-19 pandemic in the United Kingdom, the Championship season was stopped after game 37 until further notice. However, on 31 May 2020, the EFL agreed to a provisional restart date of the weekend of 20 June 2020 for the 2019/20 Championship season.

Squad statistics

       

                                         

|}

Top scorers

Disciplinary record

Transfers

Transfers in

Transfers out

Loans in

Loans out

Friendlies
On 3 June 2019, Charlton Athletic announced its first confirmed friendly taking place ahead of the 2019/20 season would be against Dagenham & Redbridge at The Chigwell Construction Stadium. A day later, two further fixtures against Welling United and Ebbsfleet United were added. On 7 June 2019, Charlton Athletic announced its had arranged a fourth friendly that would also act as long-serving defender Chris Solly's testimonial match against Aston Villa at The Valley. It was announced on 10 June that a further friendly had been organised at Colchester United. A sixth friendly against Gillingham was organised on 17 June 2019. A final behind-closed-doors friendly against CS Gaz Metan Mediaș was organised for the club's Spanish training camp.

Competitions

Championship

League table

Result summary

Results by round

Matches
On Thursday, 20 June 2019, the EFL Championship fixtures were revealed.

FA Cup

On 2 December 2019, Charlton Athletic were drawn home to West Bromwich Albion in the third round.

EFL Cup

On 20 June 2019, Charlton Athletic were drawn home to Forest Green Rovers in the first round.

Kent Senior Cup

References

Notes

Charlton Athletic
Charlton Athletic F.C. seasons
Charlton
Charlton